Jesus Jesse Garcia (born September 24, 1973) is a former Major League Baseball infielder, who played primarily at shortstop and second baseman. He bats and throws right-handed.

After attending Lee Junior College, Garcia was drafted in the 26th round of the  draft by the Baltimore Orioles. It would be  before Garcia made his major league debut with the Orioles. On December 18, Garcia was traded to the Atlanta Braves for Steve Sisco. On August 24, 2004, Garcia was released by the Braves and on November 11 he signed with the San Diego Padres. A free agent after the  season, Garcia signed a minor league contract with the Houston Astros.

The Astros released Garcia during spring training  and he signed a minor league contract with the Chicago Cubs. Garcia was released in early May.

References

External links
Baseball Almanac
Baseball Reference

1973 births
Living people
Baltimore Orioles players
Atlanta Braves players
San Diego Padres players
Baseball players from Texas
Gulf Coast Orioles players
Frederick Keys players
High Desert Mavericks players
Bowie Baysox players
Rochester Red Wings players
Richmond Braves players
Mobile BayBears players
Portland Beavers players
Round Rock Express players
Iowa Cubs players
American expatriate baseball players in Australia